Lucille Hanna McCollough (December 30, 1905March 14, 1996) was a Michigan politician.

Early life
McCollough was born on December 30, 1905, in White Rock, Michigan to parents H. William and Stella Hanna McCollough.

Education
McCollough graduated from Harbor Beach High School as valedictorian. McCollough later graduated from Western State Teachers College.

Career
McCollough served on the Dearborn City Council from 1950 to 1953. On November 2, 1954, McCollough was elected to the Michigan House of Representatives where she represented the Wayne County 16th district from January 12, 1955, to 1964. On November 4, 1964, McCollough was elected to the Michigan House of Representatives where she represented the 31st district from January 13, 1965, to 1982. During her time in the legislature, she had she had 100 percent voting attendance, which has been recorded in the Guinness Book of World Records. McCollough wrote the legislation that requires school districts in Michigan to have special education.

Personal life
Lucille married Clarence McCollough on June 16, 1925. Together they had three children, including future Michigan state senator Patrick H. McCollough. McCollough was Presbyterian.

Death and legacy
On March 14, 1996, McCollough died in Oakwood Hospital in Dearborn due to complications from a stroke. McCollough is interred at White Rock Cemetery in Huron County, Michigan. In 2002, McCollough was inducted into the Michigan Women's Hall of Fame.

References

1905 births
1996 deaths
Guinness World Records
Presbyterians from Michigan
Burials in Michigan
Michigan city council members
Politicians from Dearborn, Michigan
Women city councillors in Michigan
Women state legislators in Michigan
Democratic Party members of the Michigan House of Representatives
20th-century American women politicians
20th-century American politicians